Tiny Tony is a Philippine fantasy series on ABS-CBN adapted from the creation of Mars Ravelo. It's the third installment of the anthology Mars Ravelo's Komiks Presents. It is directed by Dondon Santos. It is based on Mars Ravelo's Pinoy superheroes and follows the success of the Kapitan Boom and Varga series. The Ravelos commissioned Reno Maniquis some years back to re-design Captain Barbell, Flash Bomba and Tiny Tony's costumes for modern times.

Plot
A science prodigy with mathematical aptitude, Tony (John Prats) is a nerd who dreams of making a difference in society. Tony is a simple guy who after a freak accident is transformed from a normal person to a tiny superhero. One day he meets an accident which literally causes him to become small. Will Tony ever return to his normal size? Or will he forever be Tiny Tony?

Synopsis
Anthony “Tony” Aniscol (John Prats) was single-handedly raised by his Nanay Eden (Susan Africa). Because of his superior intelligence, Tony got his PhD at a young age and was taken in by scientist Dr. Morgan Peralta (Pen Medina) as a laboratory assistant. While Tony becomes friends with Dr. Morgan’s daughter Michelle (Alex Gonzaga), he is despised by the doctor’s son Joaquin (Coco Martin). After a laboratory accident kills Dr. Morgan, Tony finds himself shrunk to a mere six inches. While he struggles to get back to normal, Tony must face enemies like the Indian Warrior Red Cloud (Arron Villaflor) and the greedy Joaquin. Can Tony get himself out of trouble? Will he ever get back to his Nanay Eden and Michelle? How is the rich philanthropist-politician Gil Gante (Mura) connected to his predicament?

Cast and characters

Main cast
John Prats as Tiny Tony/Anthony “Tony” Aniscol
Alex Gonzaga as Michelle Peralta - Joaquin's sister & ladylove of Tony

Supporting cast
Arron Villaflor as Bryan De Jesus/Red Cloud  - Tiny Indian Warrior
Coco Martin as Joaquin Peralta - Michelle's brother
Mura as Gil Gante
Susan Africa as Eden - Tony's mother
Gerard Acao as Jumbo Madrigal - friend of Tony & policeman
Ama Quiambao as Lola Marge - Jumbo's grandmother

Special participation
Pen Medina as Dr. Morgan Peralta - a scientist and Michelle & Joaquin's father
Zaijian Jaranilla as young Tony
Kristofer Martin as young Joaquin
EJ Jallorina as Biboy
CJ Navato as Waluigi
Sharlene San Pedro as Celine
Gee-Ann Abrahan as Mika
Dianne Medina
Gio Alvarez
Richard Quan as Tony's father.

See also
Isang Lakas
List of Komiks episodes

References

External links
Tiny Tony
Tiny Tony International Hero
Tiny Tony Drama Show

2008 Philippine television series debuts
2008 Philippine television series endings
Television series by Dreamscape Entertainment Television
Fantaserye and telefantasya
Television shows based on comics
ABS-CBN drama series
Filipino-language television shows